Xavier Newman-Johnson (born Xavier Newman, August 4, 1999) is an American football guard for the Tennessee Titans of the National Football League (NFL).

Early life and education
Newman-Johnson was born on August 4, 1999, in DeSoto, Texas. He attended DeSoto High School and was an All-American and all-state selection in football. He was ranked among the top 300 best recruits nationally by ESPN and helped his team average 540 offensive yards-per-game as a senior. Newman-Johnson initially committed to play college football at Texas.

Newman-Johnson later flipped his commitment to Colorado, then to Baylor. As a true freshman at Baylor, he appeared in 11 games, starting eight as a left guard. The following season, Newman-Johnson started three games at left guard and appeared in a further four. As a junior, he started eight games at right guard and appeared in a total of 10. In his senior season, he appeared in five games, starting four, three of which came at left guard and the remaining one at center.

After being given an extra year of eligibility due to the COVID-19 pandemic, Newman-Johnson opted to return to Baylor in 2021 for a fifth season. That year, he started all 14 games at left guard and helped the team average 219.3 rushing yards per-game, which placed 10th in the nation. He was an honorable mention all-conference selection and finished his college career with 47 games played and 37 starts.

Professional career
After going unselected in the 2022 NFL Draft, Newman-Johnson was signed by the Tennessee Titans as an undrafted free agent. He was waived at the final roster cuts, but was subsequently brought back to the practice squad. Newman-Johnson was signed to the active roster on December 23, and made his NFL debut six days later against the Dallas Cowboys.

References

External links
Tennessee Titans bio
Baylor Bears bio

Further reading

1999 births
Living people
American football offensive guards
American football offensive tackles
American football centers
People from DeSoto, Texas
Players of American football from Texas
Baylor Bears football players
Tennessee Titans players